R. Ramanathan ( – 3 December 2019) was an Indian politician from Puducherry belonging to Dravida Munnetra Kazhagam. He was elected twice as a legislator of the Puducherry Legislative Assembly.

Biography
Ramanathan was elected as a legislator of the Puducherry Legislative Assembly from Kuruvinatham in 1985. He was also elected from this constituency in 1990. He is the father of R. Radhakrishnan who was a legislator of the Puducherry Legislative Assembly and MP of Lok Sabha.

Ramanathan died of cardiac arrest on 3 December 2019 at the age of 71.

References

2019 deaths
People from Puducherry district
Dravida Munnetra Kazhagam politicians
1940s births
Puducherry MLAs 1985–1990
Puducherry MLAs 1990–1991